Vladislav Napoleonovich (Vladimir Nikolayevich) Klembovsky (28 June 1860 in Moscow Governorate – 19 July 1921) was a Russian military commander during World War I.

Alexander Kerensky, head of the Russian Provisional Government after the overthrow of the Tsar, appointed him Supreme Commander in Chief of the Russian Army in August 1917, replacing Lavr Kornilov.

Klembovsky later joined the Red Army as a volunteer, but was arrested after the Red army's defeat in Poland by the Bolsheviks and starved to death in prison.

Commands
 06.12.1915 – 30.01.1916 : 5th Army
 25.10.1916 – 20.12.1916 : 11th Army
 01.06.1917 – 29.08.1917 : Northern Front

References

External links 
 Biography on Chronos
 Photo
 Т. Федоткина. Палач королевства любви

Russian military leaders
Russian military personnel of World War I
Russian Provisional Government generals
1860 births
1921 deaths
Commanders-in-chief of the Russian Army